San Ciro is a Romanesque-style, Roman Catholic church located on Via San Siro 18 in the town of Capriate San Gervasio, in the province of Bergamo, Italy. The church was erected in the 12th-century using stone. The small church lacks aisles and has a frescoed apse.

References

Churches in the province of Bergamo
Romanesque architecture in Lombardy
12th-century Roman Catholic church buildings in Italy
Roman Catholic churches in Lombardy